The following is the discography of Overkill, an American thrash metal band formed in 1980 in New Jersey. The band has released nineteen studio albums, three live albums, two compilation albums, three EPs and one box set. They were one of the early thrash metal bands to sign to a major label (Atlantic Records in 1986), and rose to fame as part of the genre's movement of the late 1980s, along with bands such as Anthrax, Exodus, Metallica, Megadeth, Slayer and Testament. In terms of chart positions and sales, the band's most successful records are Under the Influence (1988), The Years of Decay (1989), I Hear Black (1993), The Electric Age (2012), and White Devil Armory (2014), which debuted at No. 142, No. 155, No. 122, No. 77, and No. 31 respectively on the Billboard 200 chart. As of 2006, Overkill has sold over 625,000 albums in the US since the beginning of the SoundScan era, and over 5 million records worldwide throughout their career.

Albums

Studio albums

Live albums

Compilation albums

Box sets

Extended plays

Demos

Videos

Video albums

Music videos

References

External links

 Overkill official website

Heavy metal group discographies
Discographies of American artists